In research of human subjects, a survey is a list of questions aimed for extracting specific data from a particular group of people. Surveys may be conducted by phone, mail, via the internet, and also at street corners or in malls. Surveys are used to gather or gain knowledge in fields such as social research and demography.

Survey research is often used to assess thoughts, opinions and feelings. Surveys can be specific and limited, or they can have more global, widespread goals. Psychologists and sociologists often use surveys to analyze behavior, while it is also used to meet the more pragmatic needs of the media, such as, in evaluating political candidates, public health officials, professional organizations, and advertising and marketing directors. Survey research has also been employed in various medical and surgical fields to gather information about healthcare personnel’s practice patterns and professional attitudes toward various clinical problems and diseases. Healthcare professionals that may be enrolled in survey studies in include physicians, nurses, and physical therapists among others. A survey consists of a predetermined set of questions that is given to a sample. With a representative sample, that is, one that is representative of the larger population of interest, one can describe the attitudes of the population from which the sample was drawn. Further, one can compare the attitudes of different populations as well as look for changes in attitudes over time. A good sample selection is key as it allows one to generalize the findings from the sample to the population, which is the whole purpose of survey research. In addition to this, it is important to ensure that survey questions are not biased such as using suggestive words. This prevents inaccurate results in a survey.

Types

Census

A census is the procedure of systematically acquiring and recording information about the members of a specific given population. It is a regularly occurring and official count of a particular population. The term is used mostly in connection with national population and housing censuses; other common censuses include agriculture, business, and traffic censuses. The United Nations defines the essential features of population and housing censuses as "individual enumeration, universality within a defined territory, simultaneity and defined periodicity", and recommends that population censuses be taken at least every 10 years

Other household surveys

Other surveys than the census may explore characteristics in households, such as fertility, family structure, and demographics.

Household surveys with at least 10,000 participants include:
General Household Survey, conducted in private households in Great Britain. It is a repeated cross-sectional study, conducted annually, which uses a sample of 9,731 households in the 2006 survey.
Generations and Gender Survey, conducted in several countries in Europe as well as Australia and Japan. The programme has collected least one wave of surveys in 19 countries, with an average of 9,000 respondents per country.
Household, Income and Labour Dynamics in Australia Survey, where the wave 1 panel consisted of 7,682 households and 19,914 individuals
Integrated Household Survey, a survey made up of multiple other surveys in the UK. It includes about 340,000 respondents, making it the largest collection of social data in the UK after the census.
National Survey of Family Growth, conducted in the United States by the National Center for Health Statistics division of the Centers for Disease Control and Prevention to understand trends related to fertility, family structure, and demographics in the United States. The 2006-2010 NSFG surveyed 22,682 interviews.
Panel Study of Income Dynamics in the United States, wherein data have been collected from the same families and their descendants since 1968. The study started with over 18,000 nationally representative individuals. It involved more than 9,000 individuals as of 2009.
Socio-Economic Panel, a longitudinal panel dataset of the population in Germany. It is a household-based study that started in 1984 and which reinterviews adult household members annually. In 2007, the study involved about 12,000 households, with more than 20,000 adult persons sampled.
UK households: a longitudinal study, now known as Understanding Society. Its sample size is 40,000 households from the United Kingdom or approx. 100,000 individuals.

Opinion poll

 

An opinion poll is a survey of public opinion from a particular sample. Opinion polls are usually designed to represent the opinions of a population by conducting a series of questions and then extrapolating generalities in ratio or within confidence intervals.

Healthcare surveys
Medical or health-related survey research is particularly concerned with uncovering knowledge-practice gaps. That is to say to reveal any inconsistencies between the established international recommended guidelines and the real time medical practice regarding a certain disease or clinical problem. In other words, some medical surveys aim at exploring the difference between the proper practice and the actual  practice reported by the healthcare professionals.  Medical survey research has also been used to collect information from the patients, caregivers and even the public on relevant health issues. In turn the information gathered from survey results can be used to upgrade the professional performance of healthcare personnel including physicians, develop the quality of healthcare delivered to patients, mend existing deficiencies of the healthcare delivery system and  professional health education. Furthermore, the results of survey research can inform the public health domain and help conduct health awareness campaigns in vulnerable populations and guide healthcare policy-makers. This is especially true when survey research deals with a wide spread disease that constitutes a nationwide or global health challenge.

Methodology

A single survey is made of at least a sample (or full population in the case of a census), a method of data collection (e.g., a questionnaire) and individual questions or items that become data that can be analyzed statistically. A single survey may focus on different types of topics such as preferences (e.g., for a presidential candidate), opinions (e.g., should abortion be legal?), behavior (smoking and alcohol use), or factual information (e.g., income), depending on its purpose. Since survey research is almost always based on a sample of the population, the success of the research is dependent on the representativeness of the sample with respect to a target population of interest to the researcher. That target population can range from the general population of a given country to specific groups of people within that country, to a membership list of a professional organization, or list of students enrolled in a school system  (see also sampling (statistics) and survey sampling).

Interpretation

Correlation and causality

When two variables are related, or correlated, one can make predictions for these two variables.  However, it is important to note that this does not mean causality. At this point, it is not possible to determine a causal relationship between the two variables; correlation does not imply causality. However, correlation evidence is significant because it can help identify potential causes of behavior. Path analysis is a statistical technique that can be used with correlational data. This involves the identification of mediator and moderator variables. A mediator variable is used to explain the correlation between two variables. A moderator variable affects the direction or strength of the correlation between two variables. A spurious relationship is a relationship in which the relation between two variables can be explained by a third variable.

Moreover, in survey research, correlation coefficients between two variables might be affected by measurement error, what can lead to wrongly estimated coefficients and biased substantive conclusions. Therefore, when using survey data, we need to correct correlation coefficients for measurement error.

Reported behavior versus actual behavior
The value of collected data completely depends upon how truthful respondents are in their answers on questionnaires. In general, survey researchers accept respondents’ answers as true. Survey researchers avoid reactive measurement by examining the accuracy of verbal reports, and directly observing respondents’ behavior in comparison with their verbal reports to determine what behaviors they really engage in or what attitudes they really uphold. Studies examining the association between self-reports (attitudes, intentions) and actual behavior show that the link between them—through positive—is not always strong—thus caution is needed when extrapolating self-reports to actual behaviors, Dishonesty is pronounced in some sex-related queries, with men often amplifying their number of sex partners, while women tend to downplay and slash their true number.

History
The Statistical Society of London pioneered the questionnaire in 1838. "Among the earliest acts of the Statistical Society of London ... was the appointment of committees to enquire into industrial and social conditions. One of these committees, in 1838, used the first written questionnaire of which I have any record. The committee-men prepared and printed a list of questions 'designed to elicit the complete and impartial history of strikes.'"

The most famous public survey in the United States of America is the national census. Held every ten years since 1790, the census attempts to count all persons, and also to obtain demographic data about factors such as age, ethnicity, and relationships within households.

Nielsen ratings (carried out since 1947) provide another example of public surveys in the United States. Nielsen rating track media-viewing habits (radio, television, internet, print) the results of which are used to make commissioning decisions. Some Nielsen ratings localize the data points to give marketing firms more specific information with which to target customers. Demographic data is also used to understand what influences work best to market consumer products, political campaigns, etc.

Following the invention of the telephone survey (used at least as early as the 1940s), the development of the Internet in the late-20th century fostered online surveys and web surveys.

See also
 Audience measurement
 Opinion poll
 Statistical survey
 Questionnaire
 Wiki survey

References

Public sphere